Quartzsite Elementary School District 4 is a school district in La Paz County, Arizona, United States.

There are two elementary schools in the district:
Quartzsite Elementary, 930 Quail Trail, Quartzsite, Arizona
Ehrenberg Elementary, 49241 Ehrenberg Parker Rd, Ehrenberg, Arizona

References

External links
 

Education in La Paz County, Arizona
School districts in Arizona